The 1950 Fresno State Bulldogs football team represented Fresno State College—now known as California State University, Fresno—as a member of the California Collegiate Athletic Association (CCAA) during the 1950 college football season. The team was led by first-year head coach Duke Jacobs and played home games at Ratcliffe Stadium on the campus of Fresno City College in Fresno, California. They finished the season with a record of two wins, six losses and one tie (2–6–1, 1–2–1 CCAA).

Schedule

References

Fresno State
Fresno State Bulldogs football seasons
Fresno State Bulldogs football